Paraforcellinia is a genus of mites in the family Acaridae.

Species
 Paraforcellinia saljanica Kadzhaya, 1974

References

Acaridae